The Notre Dame and Mégantic Mountains in Canada are a physiographic province of the larger Appalachian division, and also contain the Chic-Choc Mountains. The abundant mineral resources in this region have resulted in a unique mining landscape. The Notre Dame Mountains extend  from the Green Mountains of Vermont into the Gaspé Peninsula, Quebec.

References

External links

Mountain ranges of Quebec
Mountain ranges of Vermont
Subranges of the Appalachian Mountains
Physiographic provinces